Ćiro is a predominantly Croatian and occasionally Serbian name. It is within the 2,000 most common first names in Croatia. The name is more common in southern Croatia. Its first known mention was in a 1749 tax census.

Notable people 
 Ćiro Truhelka (1865–1942), Croatian archeologist, historian and art historian
 Miroslav Ćiro Blažević (born 1935), Croatian football player and manager
 Zdravko-Ćiro Kovačić (1925–2015), Croatian waterpolo player

References 

Croatian masculine given names